Tut-e Olya (also Romanized as Tūt-e ‘Olyā) is a village in Sardasht Rural District, Sardasht District, Dezful County, Khuzestan Province, Iran. At the 2006 census, its population was 801, in 143 families.

References 

Populated places in Dezful County